Malnik may refer to:
 Alvin Ira Malnik (*1933); businessman, entrepreneur, attorney and philanthropist
 a variety of wine grape; see Furmint